Billy Tsikrikas (born 11 May 1995) is a Greece international rugby league footballer who plays as  for the Canterbury-Bankstown Bulldogs in the NRL.

Background
Tsikrikas was born in Sydney, Australia, and is of Greek descent.

Playing career

Early career

Tsikrikas played the majority of his junior football at St Marys Saints in the Ron Massey Cup until 2019 when he was signed to a development contract by the Penrith Panthers. He represented the Greece national rugby league team on six occasions scoring four tries.

2019
Tsikrikas featured in the Penrith Panthers NSW Cup squad after earning a reserve grade contract, playing four games and scoring one try.

2021
In 2021, Tsikrikas had a breakout season with the Penrith reserve grade team featuring in 13 games and scoring two tries.

Move to Belmore

2022

Freshly appointed Canterbury-Bankstown Bulldogs general manager Phil Gould, having initially recruiting Tsikrikas to the Penrith Panthers handed him a train-and-trial contract. This is a conditional contract where players earn $1000 a week before being promoted to a Top 30 or development contract.

Tsikrikas began the season with the Canterbury NSW Cup team featuring in six games and scoring one try continuing his impressive form from Penrith.

A crisis struck the Canterbury football club as four players tested positive to COVID-19 As three more were injured, Phil Gould applied to the NRL for special exemption to allow Tsikrikas to replace his teammate Ava Seumanafagai on the bench for their Round 7 match against the Brisbane Broncos on Friday the 22nd of April 2022 at Suncorp Stadium

Tsikrikas, working as a teacher at Endeavour Sports High School, received the call up that he had long waited for throughout his career.

Tsikrikas was retained for the clash against the Sydney Roosters, in which he played a hand in the 16–12 win. Coming up with 30 tackles and 75 run metres including 2 tackle breaks from 29 minutes.

References

External links
Greece profile

1995 births
Living people
Australian rugby league players
Canterbury-Bankstown Bulldogs players
Greece national rugby league team players
Rugby league players from Sydney
Rugby league props
Australian people of Greek descent
Australian schoolteachers